Arctornis egerina is a species of moth of the family Erebidae first described by Charles Swinhoe in 1893. It is found in Singapore, Peninsular Malaysia, Borneo and Sumatra.

Subspecies
Arctornis egerina egerina (Singapore, Peninsular Malaysia, Borneo)
Arctornis egerina gymnophleps (Sumatra)

External links

Lymantriinae
Moths described in 1893
Moths of Asia